Ashokasundari (Sanskrit: अशोकसुन्दरी) is a Hindu goddess and daughter of the deities Shiva and Parvati. She is referenced in the Padma Purana, which narrates her story. The goddess is mostly venerated in South India in the form of Bala Tripurasundari.

Etymology
Ashokasundari was created from the wish-fulfilling tree Kalpavriksha when Parvati wished for a daughter to reduce her loneliness. The words in her name are derived from her creation. Ashoka refers to the easing of Parvati's shoka, which means "sorrow", while sundari means "beautiful girl".

Legend
The birth of Ashokasundari is recorded in the Padma Purana. In one of the variants of the tale of Nahusha, Parvati once requested Shiva to take her to the most beautiful garden in the world. As per her wishes, Shiva took her to Nandanvana, where Parvati saw a tree known as Kalpavriksha which could fulfill any wish. Since Kartikeya, the son of Parvati, had grown up and left Kailash, as a mother it caused immense grief and loneliness to her. She asked for a daughter from the wish-fulfilling tree to end her loneliness. Her wish was granted and Ashokasundari was born. Parvati prophesied that Ashokasundari would marry Nahusha of the lunar dynasty, who would be equal to Indra, the king of heaven.

Once, Ashokasundari was roaming in Nandanvana with her maids, a rakshasa (demon) called Hunda saw her and fell in love with her. However, the goddess rejected the advances of the demon and informed him about her destiny to marry Nahusha. Hunda disguised himself as a widow, whose husband was killed by him, and asked Ashokasundari to accompany her to her hermitage. The goddess went with the disguised demon and reached his palace. She discovered his treachery and cursed him to be killed by Nahusha and escaped to her parents' abode, Mount Kailash.

Hunda kidnaps the infant Nahusha from his palace, however, he is rescued by a maid of Hunda and given under the sage Vashistha's care. After a few years, Nahusha grows up and understands about his destiny to kill Hunda. Hunda abducts Ashokasundari and tells her that he had killed Nahusha. The goddess was consoled by a Kinnara couple who informed her of Nahusha's wellbeing and prophesied that she would mother a powerful son called Yayati and a hundred beautiful daughters. Nahusha fought Hunda and defeated him after a fierce battle and rescued Ashokasundari, whom he married. Over course of time, in absence of Indra, Nahusha was temporarily made the regent of heaven.

Development

Ashokasundari finds very little mention in Hindu mythology; her tale only appears in the Padma Purana.

Television Series

Her appearance in a television series Devon Ke Dev Mahadev on the life of Shiva and Parvati brought her to the notice of many. She later appeared in other series, such as Vighnaharta Ganesh.

References

Notes

Bibliography

External links

Hindu goddesses
Shaivism